Stepan Yudin (Russian: Степан Юдин, born 3 April 1980) is a male race walker from Russia.

Achievements

External links 
 

1980 births
Living people
Russian male racewalkers
Universiade medalists in athletics (track and field)
Universiade gold medalists for Russia
Medalists at the 2003 Summer Universiade